Parliamentary elections were held in the Federal Republic of Yugoslavia on 3 November 1996. A coalition of the Socialist Party of Serbia, the Yugoslav Left and New Democracy emerged as the largest bloc in the Federal Assembly, winning 64 of the 138 seats. Radoje Kontić, member of the Montenegrin ruling party, the Democratic Party of Socialists of Montenegro, was confirmed as Prime Minister of the Federal Republic of Yugoslavia. He was replaced, in 1998, by Momir Bulatović, leader of Socialist People's Party of Montenegro.

Results

References

Yugoslavia
Parliamentary
Parliamentary
Elections in Serbia and Montenegro
Yugoslavia